Mellomnuten  is a mountain located in the municipality of Ål in Buskerud, Norway.

External links
Mellomnuten Coord 

Ål
Mountains of Viken